Victor the Moor (in Latin: Victor Maurus) (born 3rd century in Mauretania; died ca. 303 in Milan) was a native of Mauretania and a Christian martyr, according to tradition, and is venerated as a saint.

Life
Victor, born into a Christian family, was a soldier in the Roman Praetorian Guard under Maximian. In the "Acts", which date back to the 8th century, it is said that Victor refused to continue his military service. Dragged to the Hippodrome of the Circus in the presence of Maximian Herculean and his adviser Anulinus, he refused to betray his beliefs despite the torments to which he was subjected. Whipped and imprisoned, after an almost miraculous escape, he was again captured. He was dragged into a nearby elm wood and decapitated around the year 303.

Veneration

His bones were later buried at an ancient basilica on the site of a former Roman mausoleum. They were later moved to the oratory of San Vittore in Ciel d'Oro, originally a free-standing chapel, commissioned by bishop Maternus to hold the relics of Saint Victor. It is now part of the Basilica of Sant'Ambrogio, built by Ambrose, fourth-century bishop of Milan, and initially called the "Basilica Martyrum". Victor's cause was promoted by Ambrose. Gregory of Tours claimed miracles occurred at Victor's grave. In 1576, Bishop Charles Borromeo had the relics returned to the rebuilt San Vittore al Corpo.  Forensic examinations conducted in 2018 indicated a male in his mid-twenties, with clear signs of decaptitation. 

Numerous churches have been dedicated to him in the city itself and throughout the Diocese of Milan and its neighbours.

His memorial day is May 8 in the Roman Catholic Church and the Evangelical Lutheran Church in America. Victor is the patron saint of prisoners and exiles.

References

External links
 The Passion of St. Victor of Milan
 http://www.deon.pl/imieniny/imie,3366,wiktora.html

3rd-century births
303 deaths
Saints from Mauretania Caesariensis
3rd-century Berber people
4th-century Christian martyrs
3rd-century Romans
Berber Christians